Cello is a 2005 South Korean horror film.

Plot 
Hong Mi-ju (Sung Hyun-ah), an avid and very talented cello player, quits her cello playing after her friend Kim Tae-yeon, also a cello player, is murdered. Her professor tries to coax her into going to a concert for Kim Tae-yeon's sister and getting a job as a professional cello player, but Mi-ju declines both the concert and the job offer. On her way home, Mi-ju hallucinates seeing a student tell her that because of her, her own music is for nothing, and promises revenge. Shaken, Mi-ju drives home and nearly avoids getting into an accident with a truck. At home, she receives a disturbing message on her cell phone.

Mi-ju's eldest daughter, the autistic Yoon-jin, as well as her husband Jun-ki, her sister-in-law Kyeong-ran, and her youngest daughter Yoon-hye throw Mi-ju a birthday party on her birthday, but even this is not bereft of the oddities that have been plaguing her recently; everyone but Yoon-jin  appears mute and emotionless. Yoon-jin sings "Happy Birthday" to Mi-ju and Kyeong-ran gives her an album as a present. The next day, Mi-ju buys a cello for Yoon-jin after Yoon-jin looks at one longingly. Yoon-hye asks Yoon-jin if she can try the cello, but the normally calm Yoon-jin bites her little sister.

As Mi-ju watches the sleeping Yoon-jin to ensure she does not get up and hurt her sister again, her face suddenly becomes ghastly. Kyeong-ran is quietly murdered by what seems to be a ghost, but nobody in the family notices or hears. Yoon-jin gets out of bed and sees Kyeong-ran's body strangled and dangling at her window. Mi-ju, meanwhile, tells Jun-ki the true story of her friend Tae-yeon's death: Kim Tae-yeon was a plain girl who struggled to play the cello as good as her friend Mi-ju, and eventually became very jealous of her, but pretended to be happy for Mi-ju as she became known for being very talented and neglected Tae-yeon. The two were in a car accident and Tae-yeon was killed while Mi-ju was simply injured.

Mi-ju later sees Yoon-jin causing Yoon-hye to fall to her death from the balcony. Mi-ju is afraid of Yoon-jin getting in trouble for her crime, and after ensuring Yoon-jin does not hurt anyone else, she hides Yoon-hye's body in the basement and lies to Jun-ki that Yoon-hye went to camp. Jun-ki discovers the body and accuses Mi-ju of killing their daughter. In the ensuing struggle, Mi-ju pushes her husband, only to find he has been stabbed by a sharp pipe and is dead. She then sees a ghost behind him that has killed him and whispers Tae-yeon's name.

A flashback reveals that Mi-ju's truthful variation of the story was not even true. In fact, the student Mi-ju saw at the beginning was not a hallucination but the ghost of Tae-yeon, and in fact Tae-yeon was actually the more talented cello player, and it was really Mi-ju who became jealous of her and pretended to be happy for her. After Tae-yeon publicly being chosen over her, Mi-ju purposely swerves while driving them home and crashes the car, harming them both, but also causing Tae-yeon to fall towards a cliff, barely hanging on. Mi-ju grabs her hand and tauntingly acts as if she is going to help her friend, but ultimately lets Tae-yeon fall to her death.

In the present, Mi-ju tries to stab Tae-yeon's ghost to stop her from going to Yoon-jin. She then sees that she has stabbed the housekeeper. Believing the cello holds the power to the ghost, Mi-ju beats it as Yoon-jin screams in her room. Mi-ju then sees that the cello is unharmed; but finds out that Yoon-jin was nearly killed and heavily wounded by the beating of the cello. Mi-ju feels Tae-yeon forcing her hand to stab Yoon-jin. She resists and stabs herself instead.

Mi-ju wakes up in the hospital to find that she was actually put into a coma after the truck crash, and that the previous events have been part of her coma. Her family members are all safe and sound.

When Mi-ju returns home, she receives the same disturbing message from before. On her birthday, she goes to the attic and finds her family there, the same way she did in the beginning of the movie. They sing "Happy Birthday" to her, and Kyeong-ran gives her the same album as she had before for a present. Inside, she finds a scribbled inscription: "This is only the beginning," before the ghostly hands of Kim Tae-yeon grasp her face.

Cast
 Sung Hyun-ah ... Hong Mi-ju
 Park Da-an ... Kim Tae-yeon
 Jeong Ho-bin ... Jun-ki
 Jin Woo ... Kyung-ran
 Kim Na-woon ... Sun-ae
 Jin Ji-hee ... Yoon-hye

References

External links 
 
 
 Cello at HanCinema

2005 films
South Korean horror films
2000s Korean-language films
Films about cellos and cellists
2005 horror films
2000s South Korean films